Robert Fitzhubert (fl. 1140) was a mercenary.

Malmesbury Castle
He is first mentioned in 1139. His origin is not known, but he is spoken of as a kinsman of William of Ypres, and as one of those Flemish mercenaries who had flocked to England at Stephen's call. On 7 Oct. 1139 he surprised by night Malmesbury Castle, which the king had seized from the Bishop of Salisbury a few months before, and burnt the village. The royal garrison of the castle fled for refuge to the abbey, but Robert soon pursued them thither, and, entering the chapter-house at the head of his followers, demanded that the fugitives should be handed over. The terrified monks with difficulty induced him to be content with the surrender of their horses. He was already plundering far and wide, when Stephen, on his way to attack Trowbridge, heard of his deeds, and, turning aside, laid siege to the castle. At the close of a week, William prevailed on Robert to surrender, and within a fortnight of his surprising the castle he had lost it and had set out to join the Earl of Gloucester.

Marlborough Castle
After five months in the Earl's service he left him secretly, and on the night of 26 March (1140) surprised and captured by escalade the famous Devizes Castle, then held for the King. The keep resisted for four days, but then fell into his hands. On the Earl of Gloucester sending his son to receive the castle from Robert, he scornfully turned him away from the gate, exclaiming that he had captured the castle for himself. He now boasted that he would be master by its means of all the country from Winchester to London, and would send for troops from Flanders. Rashly inviting John FitzGilbert, castellan of Marlborough, to join him in his schemes, he was decoyed by him to Marlborough Castle and there entrapped. The Earl of Gloucester, on hearing of this, hastened at once to Marlborough, and at length by bribes and promises obtained possession of Robert. The prisoner was then taken to Devizes, and the garrison, according to the practice of the time, warned that he would be hanged unless they surrendered the castle. They pleaded the oath they had sworn to him that they would never do so, and declined. Two of his nephews were then hanged, and at last Robert himself. The castle was subsequently sold by the garrison to the king. This episode is dwelt on at some length by the chroniclers, who were greatly impressed by the savage cruelty, the impious blasphemy, and the transcendent wickedness of this daring adventurer.

References

Year of birth missing
Year of death missing
12th-century English people